Lowell Heritage State Park is a public recreation area and historical preserve located in Lowell, Massachusetts, that protects and promotes the city's seminal role in the American Industrial Revolution. The state park was established in 1974 as a precursor to Lowell National Historical Park, which was created in 1978. Aside from the functions the national park also serves, the state park maintains additional sites around the city such as the Sampas Pavilion.

References

External links
Lowell Heritage State Park Department of Conservation and Recreation

Parks in Lowell, Massachusetts
Bay Circuit Trail
State parks of Massachusetts
Protected areas established in 1974
1974 establishments in Massachusetts